Wilhelm Schneider (9 July 1909 – 28 December 1988) was a Polish athlete. He competed in the men's pole vault at the 1936 Summer Olympics.

References

External links
 

1909 births
1988 deaths
Athletes (track and field) at the 1936 Summer Olympics
Polish male pole vaulters
Olympic athletes of Poland
Sportspeople from Katowice